Silver Screen Partners refers to four limited partnerships organized as an alternative funding source for film production originally formed by American investor Roland W. Betts as a collaboration with cable television network HBO in 1983. The managing general partner for the partnerships was Silver Screen Management, Inc.

Silver Screen Partners entered into an agreement with The Walt Disney Company beginning in 1985 to collaborate with the Walt Disney Pictures, Walt Disney Feature Animation, Hollywood Pictures, and Touchstone Pictures studios to produce works such as The Great Mouse Detective; Return to Oz; The Black Cauldron; Volunteers; Down and Out in Beverly Hills; Three Men and a Baby; Good Morning, Vietnam; Cocktail; Oliver & Company; Dead Poets Society; Who Framed Roger Rabbit;  Honey, I Shrunk the Kids;  Turner & Hooch; The Little Mermaid; Pretty Woman; Dick Tracy; The Rescuers Down Under; Beauty and the Beast; and Encino Man. Despite a sting of successful films, Silver Screen Partners became defunct in 1992.

Former U.S. President George W. Bush was a member of Silver Screen Management, Inc.'s board of directors from 1983 to 1993. This became a part of the campaign issue over Hollywood's "pervasiveness of violence", centered around Silver Screen Management Board's approval of the highly violent horror-suspense film The Hitcher, when Bush ran for president in 2000.

History
The original Silver Screen Partners L.P. was organized by New York film investment broker Roland W. Betts to fund movies for HBO on April 19, 1983, and officially formed in Delaware on June 8 of that year. The limited partnerships (13,000) sold through EF Hutton were oversubscribed and raised $83 million. HBO made a 50 percent guarantee on their investment for exclusive cable rights. Another 40% was guaranteed by Thorn EMI, a British firm,  for foreign distribution and foreign TV and videocassette markets. Additional income was lined up for domestic videocassette sales. HBO's film division was just starting out so film output was slow. For the Silver Screen/HBO films, the partnership was active in the process from selecting film pitches and negotiating release dates with the distributor. In 1984, the first HBO/Silver Screen movie, Flashpoint, was released through TriStar Pictures as were all the HBO/Silver Screen films.

Silver Screen Partners II, L.P. began financing films for The Walt Disney Company in 1985 with $193 million from 20,000 limited partners. Silver Screen was hands-off with Disney given its name and new management team led by Michael Eisner, formerly at Paramount. HBO was expecting that Silver Screen would return to them for its third limited partnership. However, in January 1987, Silver Screen Partners III began financing movies for Disney with $300 million raised, the largest amount raised for a film financing limited partnership by EF Hutton.

Silver Screen's fourth limited partnership, Silver Screen Partners IV, was also set up to finance Disney's studios. On October 23, 1990, The Walt Disney Company formed Touchwood Pacific Partners which supplanted the Silver Screen Partnership series as their movie studios' primary source of funding.

In 1991, Silver Screen Partners III, L.P. was among a group of production companies were sued for copyright infringement over Who Framed Roger Rabbit's "End Title" song.

Structure
The partnerships paid for the movie's production costs and shared in the gross dollars in all markets from theater to television. Limited partners received their return before the production company could defray any of their expenses. This is preferred by investors as it guarantees some return if the film fails or has budget overrun and from the producer's overhead. Profits from a single film cannot be used to cover losses on other films, making the partnership somewhat risky.

List of notable Silver Screen Partners films

Notes

References

External links

 SEC Filings for Silver Screen Partners L. P.
 SEC Filings for Silver Screen Partners II L. P.
 SEC Filings for Silver Screen Partners III L. P.
 SEC Filings for Silver Screen Partners IV L. P.

Walt Disney Studios (division)
Mass media companies established in 1982
1982 establishments in the United States
Mass media companies disestablished in 1992
1992 disestablishments in the United States